The Modine-Benstead Observatory is an astronomical observatory in Union Grove, Wisconsin run by the Racine Astronomical Society. It opened in 1963 and has public viewing nights monthly during the summer and other events throughout the year for members.

The observatory is maintained through visitor donations to the Racine Astronomical Society, which is a 501(c)(3) non-profit organization.

The Modine-Benstead Observatory features two domed buildings that house one 16-inch Newtonian Cassegrain reflecting telescope and one 14-inch Schmitt Cassegrain reflecting telescope.

Unlike some more modern observatories, visitors are allowed to look through the telescopes directly rather than viewing the images through a computer.

See also
 List of astronomical observatories
 List of planetariums

References

External links
Racine Astronomical Society website

Astronomical observatories in Wisconsin
Tourist attractions in Racine County, Wisconsin
Buildings and structures in Racine County, Wisconsin